Carol Saunders Wood (born February 9, 1945, in Pennington Gap, Virginia) is a retired American mathematician, the Edward Burr Van Vleck Professor of Mathematics, Emerita, at Wesleyan University. Her research concerns mathematical logic and model-theoretic algebra, and in particular the theory of differentially closed fields.

Wood graduated in 1966 from Randolph-Macon Woman's College, a small United Methodist college in Lynchburg, Virginia. She earned her doctorate in 1971 from Yale University with a dissertation on forcing supervised by Abraham Robinson. At Wesleyan, she served three times as department chair. She was president of the Association for Women in Mathematics from 1991 to 1993, and served on the board of trustees of the American Mathematical Society from 2002 to 2007. She has served on the AMS Committee on Women in Mathematics since it was formed in 2012 and was chair from 2012 to 2015. She supervised 4 doctoral students at Wesleyan.

Wood was the 1998 commencement speaker for mathematics at the University of California, Berkeley. In 2012, she became one of the inaugural fellows of the American Mathematical Society. In 2017, she was selected as a fellow of the Association for Women in Mathematics in the inaugural class.

References

1945 births
Living people
20th-century American mathematicians
21st-century American mathematicians
American women mathematicians
Yale University alumni
Wesleyan University faculty
Fellows of the American Mathematical Society
Fellows of the Association for Women in Mathematics
People from Pennington Gap, Virginia
20th-century women mathematicians
21st-century women mathematicians
Mathematicians from Virginia
20th-century American women
21st-century American women